Chourmouzios the Archivist or Chourmouzios Chartophylax ("Chourmoúzios the Chartophýlax"), also known with the nickname "the Chalkenteros" ("he with a copper intestine"), born Chourmouzios Georgiou (Halki, c. 1770 – Halki, 1840) was an Ottoman Greek composer, musician, music teacher and secretary of the Ottoman Empire.

Early life 
Chourmouzios was the son of Georgios and was born in Halki, an island in Propontis, and due to a meaty protuberance on the head, they called him "Yamalis" (Turkish: yamali, "patched"). He was a student of the Byzantine music famous cantors and music teachers Iakovos Protopsaltes and Georgios of Crete.

Career 
Chourmouzios served for 40 years as a lead cantor in Saint Demetrius of Tatavla, in Saint John of Galata, in the Sinaitic Metochion of Valatas and again in Saint Demetrius church. He taught at the Music Patriarchal School, throughout its operation (1815–1821). He was one of the creators of musical notation of the New Method, along with Gregorios Protopsaltes and Chrysanthos of Madytos; he also transcribed most of the Ecclesiastical Music to the New Method and was awarded for his work with 10,000 grosi and the title of Chartophylax (Archivist) of the Great Church.

Works 
With 18 years of hard labour, Chourmouzios explained all the melodies of the ancient composers, from Saint John of Damascus until Manuel Protopsaltes. These consisted of 70 volumes, which were bought in 1838 by Patriarch Athanasius of Jerusalem, and were looked after by Cyril II, archpriest of the Sion Church. He reduced them into fewer volumes and ordered that they be bound and kept in the library of the Holy Sepulchre in Phanar, where they are currently present.

He edited as long as he lived the publication of his following works:

In the National Library of Greece there are 34 of his manuscripts (codexs and volumes).

References

Sources 

1770s births
1840 deaths
Year of birth uncertain
Greeks from the Ottoman Empire
Greek musicians
Greek composers
Byzantine music
18th-century Greek people
19th-century Greek people
People from Princes' Islands